Harbord Collegiate Institute (HCI or Harbord) is a public secondary school located in downtown Toronto, Ontario, Canada. The school is located in the Palmerston-Little Italy-Annex neighbourhood, situated on the north side of Harbord Street, between Euclid Avenue and Manning Avenue. From the 1920s to the 1950s, about 90 percent of the student body was Jewish, while today the student body largely consists of students of East Asian and Portuguese descent.

History 

Harbord was opened in 1892 as the Harbord Street Collegiate Institute. Harbord's first centennial was celebrated in 1992 and included the inauguration of the Harbord museum, a repository of Harbord memorabilia. To mark the event, Harbord's alumni group, the Harbord Club, published a 300-page history of the school entitled The Happy Ghosts of Harbord, which traces the history of the school from its opening in 1892 to 1992. The original school building was Jacobethan Revival and replaced with the Collegiate Gothic wing in 1932.

On November 11, 2005, a Remembrance Day ceremony took place at Harbord. With the donations from the W. Garfield Weston Foundation and many other corporate sponsors and individuals, the rededication of the 1921 World War I monument back to its original splendour was held. In May 2007, a second monument created to remember World War II was revealed in another ceremony.

Harbord Club 
The Harbord Club has 2600 members. It was established in 1978 by Elsie Affleck, who brought along other alumni including Ken Prentice, Willie Zimmerman, Johnny Wayne, Max Goldhar and Julius Molinaro. The Harbordite, founded in 1979, is the Harbord Club newsletter that keeps former students of the school in contact with one another and up-to-date on Harbord activities. The Harbord Charitable Foundation was also created at this time, supporting both student scholarships and alumni activities. The Directors of the Harbord Club are as follows: Syd Moscoe, Ben Lee, Sid Ingham, Belinda Medeiros-Felix, Vasan Persad, Diana Dasilva and Sierra Medeiros-Felix.

Notable alumni 

 Zanana Akande - Ontario NDP MPP and first Black woman Cabinet minister in Canada
 Charles Best - co-discoverer of Insulin
 Kathleen Coburn - leading scholar on the works of Samuel Taylor Coleridge
 David Cronenberg - filmmaker
 Jack Cole - Founder of Coles (bookstore)
 Charles Trick Currelly - founder and first curator of the Royal Ontario Museum
 Victor Feldbrill - Former Conductor of the Toronto Symphony Orchestra
 Helen Freedhoff - theoretical physicist
 Murray Frum, real estate developer and philanthropist
Frank Gehry - architect and designer
 Adam Giambrone - former Toronto city councillor and TTC chair
 Philip Givens - former Toronto Mayor
 Eddie Goodman - former Lawyer and politician
 Paul James, award-winning Canadian blues and roots musician; stage name of Paul James Vigna.
 Irving Kaplansky - mathematician 
 Max Kerman - Juno Award-winning Lead Singer of Arkells
Katerina Lanfranco - Artist
 Stephen Lewis - former leader of the Ontario NDP, former UN Ambassador, UN Special Envoy for HIV/AIDS in Africa
 Howie Mandel - Actor
 Joe Pantalone - former Toronto city councillor
Reva Potashin - psychology professor
 Louis Rasminsky - former Governor of the Bank of Canada
 Harry Rosen — clothier
 Lee Ross - influential social psychologist
 Morley Safer - CBS News Anchor
 Anna Sandor - screenwriter
 Sam Shopsowitz - founder of Shopsy's restaurant
 Sam Sniderman - founder of Sam the Record Man
 Herbert Stricker - Urban Planner, Toronto Land Developer, Professor University of Waterloo, Athlete for the Toronto Argos
 Steven Staryk - violinist
 Gordon Stulberg - President of 20th Century Fox
 Kiefer Sutherland - actor
 Johnny Wayne and Frank Shuster (Wayne and Shuster) - comedians
 Philip White - former Mayor of York, Ontario
 Dos Reis Brothers Hugo and Tiago(Legends and Foosball Champions)

Demographics 

From the 1920s to the 1950s, about 90% of the student body was Jewish. Today, the student body largely consists of students of Korean and Portuguese descent, which is representative of the surrounding neighbourhoods. Many of the clubs at Harbord are reflective of the ethnic groups present. The Harbord language program offers courses in Spanish, French, Portuguese and German.

Harbord has three French programs: Immersion, Extended and Core French. These classes offer students an opportunity to become bilingual in Canada's official languages. There is a French Club within Harbord. Harbord also has a full ESL (English as a Second Language) program which helps all students new to Canada to learn English.

Clubs 

The Student Activity Council, or SAC, is one of the largest student-run organisation at Harbord Collegiate Institute. TigerTalk is Harbord's official newspaper. It covers topics related to the school as well as a variety of other topics. It has won multiple awards from the Toronto Star's high school newspaper competition. 

The Harbord Athletic Council (HAC), is a club at Harbord that organises most athletic events, such as the annual Athletic Banquet and intramural games. The Harbord Debating Society is a place to enhance students’ political awareness as well as their oratorical skills. Each year, students participate in tournaments, such as the Ontario Model Parliament and the Southern Ontario Model United Nations Assembly. The Empowered Student Partnership is a new club at Harbord that works with the TDSB, the Toronto Police Service and the Toronto Catholic District School Board to make the school and the community a safer and better place. They work towards minimizing violence, drug use, graffiti, guns and racism.

The Key Club is an international student-led organisation which provides its members with opportunities to provide service, build character and develop leadership." Members of Harbord C.I.'s Key Club have volunteered for Epilepsy Toronto, the Canadian Cancer Society, The Liver Foundation, the Heart & Stroke Foundation, Canadian National Institute for the Blind (CNIB), the Scotiabank Waterfront Marathon and many other non-profit organisations.

The Business Club gather at lunch and/or after school to learn about business topics.  They participate in business competitions including DECA and JA Titan. The "Tiger Techs" are Harbord's robotics team. They participate as team 919 in the FIRST Robotics Competition.

Sports offered at Harbord are:

Arts

Visual Arts 
Harbord offers a visual arts program for each grade exposing students to materials, concepts and skills. Studios offer lessons in drawing, painting, ceramics, printmaking, photography, animation, design, and life drawing. Studies in design allow students to partake in fashion design (an annual fashion show), architectural design and interior design as well as text and graphic design. Art history is woven into the assignments as is theory in aesthetics.

Harbord has alumni studying visual arts and design at post secondary institutions throughout Canada, including Nova Scotia College of Art and Design, Concordia, Ryerson, and OCAD university. Student work can be viewed at the Creative Arts Festival held every year.

Band 
The band program goes from the Grade 9 Beginner Band to the Grade 12 Senior Band. Harbord's Jazz Band is conducted by Mr. Alberts. Instruments in the band include flute, clarinet, saxophone, French horn, trombone, tuba, bass guitar, keyboard, drums, baritone and trumpet. The band performs at many assemblies and concerts including the Remembrance Ceremony, Senior Showcase, Feeder School Concert, Commencement and the Farewell Assembly.

Vocal 
The classes range from Grade 9 Beginner Vocal to Senior Vocal. There is a Cantemus Choir at Harbord that sings for events inside and outside of Harbord.  The choir has participated at the Kiwanis Festival multiple times.

Strings 
The classes include the Grade 9 Beginner Strings, the Junior Strings and the Senior Strings. Instruments available for strings at Harbord include: violin, viola, cello and bass.  Harbord's String Quartet won First Prize at last year's Kiwanis Festival.  The Chamber Orchestra has performed at other venues such as Massey Hall, and George Weston Hall. The Strings Chamber Orchestra plays at school events such as the Awards Assembly, Feeder School Concert and Senior Concert, and accompanies the Cantemus Choir.

"Onward Harbord" 
"Onward Harbord" is Harbord's official song, and is sung along with the school band playing at the same time.  It is sung to the tune of the popular fight song "On, Wisconsin!"; Harbord is one of some 2,500 schools using some variation of this piece as their school song. Generally at the behest of the principal ("One more time!"), the song gets sung twice. The lyrics were written by former band teacher Larry Bond. The lyrics are as follows:

See also
List of high schools in Ontario
List of educational institutions in Toronto
List of oldest buildings and structures in Toronto
Education in Toronto

References

External links 

 Harbord Collegiate Institute
 Harbord Club (Alumni Association)

High schools in Toronto
Schools in the TDSB
Educational institutions established in 1892
1892 establishments in Ontario